The Lordsburg High School, at 209 Penn St. in Lordsburg, New Mexico, was listed on the National Register of Historic Places in 2015.

It is the old high school building.

Its preservation was a subject of controversy.

References

		
National Register of Historic Places in Hidalgo County, New Mexico
High schools in New Mexico